In four-dimensional geometry, the spherinder, or spherical cylinder or spherical prism, is a geometric object, defined as the Cartesian product of a 3-ball (or solid 2-sphere) of radius r1 and a line segment of length 2r2:

Like the duocylinder, it is also analogous to a cylinder in 3-space, which is the Cartesian product of a disk with a line segment.

It can be seen in 3-dimensional space by stereographic projection as two concentric spheres, in a similar way that a tesseract (cubic prism) can be projected as two concentric cubes, and how a circular cylinder can be projected into 2-dimensional space as two concentric circles.

Relation to other shapes 

In 3-space, a cylinder can be considered intermediate between a cube and a sphere.  In 4-space there are three intermediate forms between the tesseract and the hypersphere.  Altogether, they are the:
 tesseract (1-ball × 1-ball × 1-ball × 1-ball), whose hypersurface is eight cubes connected at 24 squares
 cubinder (2-ball × 1-ball × 1-ball)
 spherinder (3-ball × 1-ball), whose hypersurface is two 3-balls and a tube-like cell connected at the respective bounding spheres of the 3-balls
 duocylinder (2-ball × 2-ball)
 glome (4-ball), whose hypersurface is a 3-sphere without any connecting boundaries.

These constructions correspond to the five partitions of 4, the number of dimensions.

If the two ends of a spherinder are connected together, or equivalently if a sphere is dragged around a circle perpendicular to its 3-space, it traces out a spheritorus. If the two ends of an uncapped spherinder are rolled inward, the resulting shape is a torisphere.

Spherindrical coordinate system 
One can define a "spherindrical" coordinate system , consisting of spherical coordinates with an extra coordinate . This is analogous to how cylindrical coordinates are defined:  and  being polar coordinates with an elevation coordinate .

Measurements

Hypervolume 
Given a spherinder with a spherical base of radius  and a height , the hypervolume of the spherinder is given by

Surface volume 
The surface volume of a spherinder, like the surface area of a cylinder, is made up of three parts:

 the volume of the top base: 
 the volume of the bottom base: 
 the volume of the lateral 3D surface: , which is the surface area of the spherical base times the height

Therefore, the total surface volume is

Proof 

The above formulas for hypervolume and surface volume can be proven using integration. The hypervolume of an arbitrary 4D region is given by the quadruple integral 

The hypervolume of the spherinder can be integrated over spherindrical coordinates.

Related 4-polytopes 

The spherinder is related to the uniform prismatic polychora, which are cartesian product of a regular or semiregular polyhedron and a line segment. There are eighteen convex uniform prisms based on the Platonic and Archimedean solids (tetrahedral prism, truncated tetrahedral prism, cubic prism, cuboctahedral prism, octahedral prism, rhombicuboctahedral prism, truncated cubic prism, truncated octahedral prism, truncated cuboctahedral prism, snub cubic prism, dodecahedral prism, icosidodecahedral prism, icosahedral prism, truncated dodecahedral prism, rhombicosidodecahedral prism, truncated icosahedral prism, truncated icosidodecahedral prism, snub dodecahedral prism), plus an infinite family based on antiprisms, and another infinite family of uniform duoprisms, which are products of two regular polygons.

See also 
 Clifford torus

References 
 The Fourth Dimension Simply Explained, Henry P. Manning, Munn & Company, 1910, New York. Available from the University of Virginia library. Also accessible online: The Fourth Dimension Simply Explained—contains a description of duoprisms and duocylinders (double cylinders)
 The Visual Guide To Extra Dimensions: Visualizing The Fourth Dimension, Higher-Dimensional Polytopes, And Curved Hypersurfaces, Chris McMullen, 2008, 

Four-dimensional geometry
Geometric objects
Spherical geometry